Thelma Norma Meryl McKenzie ( Murden; born 6 April 1915, date of death unknown) was an Australian Test cricket player.

Biography

Thelma Murden was born in Wallerawang, New South Wales. She attended Lithgow High School and was prominent in sport in Lithgow. She married George McKenzie. 

McKenzie played one Test for Australia in Wellington in 1948, but she did not bat or bowl or keep wicket. She also played against the touring England team and was New South Wales' regular wicket-keeper in state games.  She played for the Annandale Cricket Club and worked for a dentist.

McKenzie is deceased.

References

1915 births
Year of death missing
Australia women Test cricketers